Maitreyi Ramakrishnan (born 28 December 2001) is a Canadian actress. She is known for her leading role as Devi Vishwakumar in the Netflix teen comedy series Never Have I Ever (2020–present) and as Priya Mangal in the Pixar film Turning Red (2022).

Early life and education
Ramakrishnan was born and raised in Mississauga, Ontario. She was born to Tamil parents who immigrated to Canada as refugees from Sri Lanka due to the civil war. She identifies herself as Tamil Canadian rather than Sri Lankan. She went to Lisgar Middle School for elementary and graduated from Meadowvale Secondary School.

Ramakrishnan made the decision to pursue an acting career in her last year at Meadowvale, and got the role in the Netflix teen comedy series Never Have I Ever less than a year after. She deferred her acceptance to the theatre program at York University in Toronto, which she had initially planned to attend the fall after she graduated high school, so she could shoot the series in Los Angeles. In 2021, she deferred her acceptance a second time, while also switching her degree to human rights and equity studies.

Career
Ramakrishnan made her professional acting debut as Devi Vishwakumar, the protagonist, in the Netflix teen comedy streaming television series Never Have I Ever. In 2019, she was chosen by Mindy Kaling out of 15,000 candidates that had applied for an open casting call for the show. Ramakrishnan created her audition tape at a local library, using her mother's camera, eventually being asked to send four more videos, before having a screen test in Los Angeles and being offered the role. Ramakrishnan was 17 at the time of her casting and had not acted professionally. Her casting received significant media attention, especially in Canada, both due to the nature of the open casting call and for her Tamil Canadian identity. The same year, Today named her one of eighteen "Groundbreakers", a list of girls who were breaking down barriers and changing the world.

In late April 2020, Never Have I Ever premiered on Netflix. Both the series and Ramakrishnan's performance received positive reviews, with Variety saying it was a "breakout performance". She received nominations for an Independent Spirit Award, a Canadian Screen Award, and an MTV Movie & TV Award. In July 2020, Netflix reported the series had been viewed by 40 million households globally since its release. In May 2020, Ramakrishnan was a co-host for the livestream segments of the 8th Canadian Screen Awards, along with Lloyd Robertson, Herbie Kuhn, Emma Hunter, Evany Rosen, Kayla Lorette, Eric McCormack, and Théodore Pellerin. Later that month, she also took part in the live-read series Acting for a Cause, appearing as Olivia for a live staged reading of William Shakespeare's play Twelfth Night, to help raise money for a local hospital in Chicago, which was struggling to combat the COVID-19 pandemic.

In February 2021, Ramakrishnan was included and named as Breakout Actor in Time's Time100 Next list of influential, rising stars. She also reprised her role as protagonist, Devi Vishwakumar, in the second season of Netflix's Never Have I Ever, which premiered on the streaming platform in July that year. The season was positively received with critics and audiences praising Ramakrishnan's performance.

In March 2022, Ramakrishnan was announced as a brand ambassador for clothing retailer American Eagle's "Member's Always: Future Together" campaign along with Madelyn Cline, Joshua Bassett, Michael Evans Behling, Coco Gauff, and Mxmtoon. Later that month, she voiced the character of Priya Mangal, a deadpan girl that is one of the protagonist's best friends, in the Pixar animated fantasy comedy film Turning Red. The film was released on Disney+ along with a limited theatrical release, and received critical acclaim. In April 2022, she began starring in the voice role of Zipp Storm, in the My Little Pony franchise's made-for-YouTube 2D animated web series, My Little Pony: Tell Your Tale (replacing Liza Koshy who had voiced the character in the 2021 Netflix film My Little Pony: A New Generation). That same month, Ramakrishnan received the honorary Radius Award from the Academy of Canadian Cinema & Television at the 10th Canadian Screen Awards, for her global impact on television of South Asian representation in Hollywood and breaking Asian stereotypes, as well as her work as a Canadian. In May 2022, she reprised her voice role as Zipp Storm in the Netflix CGI-animated series special — My Little Pony: Make Your Mark.

Upcoming work
Ramakrishnan reprised her role as Devi Vishwakumar in the third season of Never Have I Ever; principal photography began towards the end of November 2021 and wrapped up in late February 2022. The new season premiered on 12 August 2022, on Netflix. She will also be reprising her role as her character Zipp Storm in the Netflix computer-animated series My Little Pony: Make Your Mark, and the CGI-animated special My Little Pony: Winter Wishday, which are set to premiere on 26 September and in November 2022, on the streaming platform respectively. She has also committed to star in the upcoming Netflix romantic comedy film The Netherfield Girls, a contemporary adaptation of Jane Austen's novel Pride and Prejudice, which will mark Ramakrishnan's film acting debut.

Filmography

Television

Film

Awards and nominations

See also
 South Asian Canadians in the Greater Toronto Area
 List of Tamil people

References

External links
 

2001 births
21st-century Canadian actresses
Actresses from Ontario
Canadian actresses of Asian descent
Canadian people of Sri Lankan Tamil descent
Canadian web series actresses
Living people
People from Mississauga
Sri Lankan Tamil actresses
Tamil television actresses